Thomshill, located  south of Elgin in Moray, Scotland, is the site of an excavated rectilinear enclosure that has been interpreted as a possible Roman military camp or fort.

Alongside similar sites at Boyndie, Balnageith, Easter Galcantray and Tarradale, the possibility that Thomshill represents a Roman fort has been seen as evidence that the Roman Army under Agricola occupied Moray after the Battle of Mons Graupius in AD84.

Discovery and excavation
In 1834 the New Statistical Account of Scotland described "rectangular trenches, or, as some may say, a Roman castra at The Foths" within the parish of Birnie. In 1871 the Ordnance Survey recorded "the remains of rectangular trenches, said to be a Roman camp, but almost erased by cultivation" in the district. By 1971 no visible trace remained.

Ground observation and  aerial photography during the 1980s revealed cropmarks suggesting three sides of a rectilinear ditched enclosure, situated on an eroded spur overlooking a dry river valley dominated by two nearby distilleries. Trial excavations took place in September 1982; and over subsequent excavations between 1985 and 1990 a total of 44 trenches were cut across the lines of the ditch, the interior of the enclosure and notable surrounding features.

Excavation showed the site's enclosing ditch to be V-shaped, with a well-defined sump or cleaning slot along the base. The corners of the enclosure were rounded and a series of post-holes were found close to the inner edge of the southern side of the enclosure. Two small ditches that predated the main enclosure were also found on the site, and were taken to represent an unknown earlier phase of occupation.

Interpretation
The absence of direct dating evidence makes assigning a date and function difficult, but the site was interpreted by its excavators as representing  a Roman military work of Agricolan date, based on its location, its plan as a rectangular enclosure with rounded corners, and the apparently Roman V-shaped profile of the ditch itself. Thomshill's excavators argued that its closest parallels were the single-ditched forts of the Flavian period found elsewhere in Scotland such as that at Fendoch, suggesting that Thomshill might have been an auxiliary fort built to house a quingenary unit.

Following these excavations, the site at Thomshill was interpreted as being comparable to those at Balnageith, Boyndie and Easter Galcantray, which were seen as semi-permanent Roman fortifications and explained as the hibernia or winter quarters taken in or close to the land of the Boresti by the forces of Agricola after their victory at the Battle of Mons Graupius, as described by Tacitus in his biography Agricola.

This interpretation has proved controversial, with much of the evidence criticised as circumstantial. Some reviewers have questioned whether the sites are Roman at all; some have argued that the Roman status of the sites is possible but unproven, on the basis that rectilinear enclosures of this scale are not otherwise found among native sites in the Moray area; others have argued that they "would be accepted without cavil as Roman anywhere else". Of the suggested sites Thomshill has been seen as particularly problematic due its lack of dating evidence or surviving internal features.

References

Bibliography
 
 
 

Archaeological sites in Moray
Roman legionary fortresses in Scotland